Specklinia chontalensis is a species of orchid plant native to Nicaragua.

References 

chontalensis
Flora of Nicaragua